Gametangiogamy is the fusion  or copulation of whole gametangia in certain members of the phyla Zygomycota and Ascomycota. The copulated union of multinuclear cells is followed after a more or less long period dikaryophase, by a pairwise  fusion (karyogamy) of sexually  different nuclei. 

In this case, karyogamy takes place simultaneously between the nuclei of many pairs of nuclei, not as in gametogamy between two gametic nuclei (polyfertilization).

See also
Gametogamy
Karyogamy
Fertilization

References

Sexual reproduction
Mycology